The 2017–18 BBL Trophy was the 30th edition of the BBL Trophy, an annual cup competition for British basketball teams, organised by the British Basketball League (BBL). Besides BBL clubs, clubs from the National Basketball League (NBL) participated. The Leicester Riders won their third trophy title. The competition was played from 8 December 2017 until 4 March 2018.

Participants

British Basketball League (BBL)
Leicester Riders
Plymouth Raiders
Newcastle Eagles
Leeds Force
Glasgow Rocks
Worcester Wolves
Sheffield Sharks
London Lions
Surrey Scorchers
Manchester Giants
NBL Division 1
Loughborough Student Riders
Manchester Magic
Sony Centre Fury
Team Northumbria

Bracket

References

See also
2017–18 British Basketball League season
2017–18 BBL Cup

BBL Trophy seasons
2017–18 in British basketball